Sagiv Yehezkel (or Jehezkel, ; born 21 March 1995) is an Israeli footballer who plays as a Right Winger for Hapoel Be'er Sheva.

Early life
Yehezkel was born and raised in Rishon LeZion, Israel, to an Israeli family of Jewish descent.

Career
On February 11, 2021, Yehezkel transferred to Hapoel Be'er Sheva on a three-and-a-half year contract. He made his debut on February 13 in his team's 2–2 draw with Hapoel Haifa.

Honours

Club 
Hapoel Be'er Sheva
State Cup: 2021–22
Super Cup: 2022

See also 
 List of Jewish footballers
 List of Jews in sports
 List of Israelis

References

External links

1995 births
Living people
Israeli footballers
Israeli Jews
Jewish footballers
Hapoel Tel Aviv F.C. players
Maccabi Tel Aviv F.C. players
Hapoel Ironi Kiryat Shmona F.C. players
Bnei Yehuda Tel Aviv F.C. players
F.C. Ashdod players
Hapoel Be'er Sheva F.C. players
Israeli Premier League players
Footballers from Rishon LeZion
Israel under-21 international footballers
Association football forwards